Terme may refer to:
Terme, a town in Turkey
Terme District, a district in Turkey
Terme River, a river in Turkey
Gökçeören, a village in Turkey formerly called Terme
Terme section of Chianciano Terme, Italy

See also
 Term (disambiguation)
 Termeh, a type of textile